The Villain is the second solo studio album by American rapper Trick Trick. The record features guest appearances by the likes of Big Sweetz, C.A.C, Eminem, Esham, Fatt Father, Goon Sqwad, Guilty Simpson, Ice Cube, Kid Rock, Marv Won, Paradime, Royce Da 5'9", Throatslash, and his Mathis Family Choir group.

Production and promotion
The eighteen track LP was released on November 11, 2008, under the record labels of WonderBoy Entertainment, Time Entertainment LLC and Koch Records. Audio production on the album was handled by Eminem, Dr. Dre, Lil' Jon, and Trick Trick himself.

Working on The Villain, Trick Trick also worked with Fatt Father on his self-titled debut solo album via Time Ent. During 2008, Fatts released two mixtapes You Are The Father! and Christmas With Fatt Father promoting both projects.

The first single off the album was "Let It Fly" featured vocals from Ice Cube, with audio production being handled by Lil' Jon.

Controversy
Within days of release, controversy surrounded this album, revolving especially around anti-homosexual subject matter. AllHipHop.com article published on November 11, 2008, pointed out some of the objectionable lyrics on the album, such as "...He's a fucking faggot so I'm lettin' off my AK/Bust 'em in his forehead/He ain't worth lettin' live/A man and man shouldn’t raise another man's kids!" In discussing the album, Trick Trick remarks that "Homosexuals are probably not going to like this album. But it's okay, I don't want their faggot money any goddamn way. It's just that every time that you turn on the TV, that sissy shit is on, and they act like it's fucking okay...and I address that issue. I address it hard as hell".

In response to this attack on the gay community, AllHipHop posted an article on November 13 where various gay and lesbian hip-hop musicians responded in a variety of different ways.

Track listing

Personnel

Aaron Julson – bass
Andre Young – producer
Byron Simpson – rap vocals
Chris Mathis – executive producer, mixing, producer, rap vocals
DeShaun Holton – rap vocals
Esham Smith – rap vocals
Fred Beauregard – rap vocals
Jeff Bass – bass
Jonathan Smith – producer, back vocals
Kameel Mathis – rap vocals
Marshall Mathers – producer, rap vocals
Marvin O'Neil – rap vocals
O'Shea Jackson – rap vocals
Robert Ritchie – rap vocals
Ryan Montgomery – rap vocals
Shabazz Ford – rap vocals
T-Money Green – bass

References

2008 albums
E1 Music albums
Trick-Trick albums
Albums produced by Eminem
Albums produced by Dr. Dre
Albums produced by Lil Jon
21st-century controversies
LGBT-related controversies in music
Obscenity controversies in music
Gangsta rap albums by American artists